Group A of the WABA League took place between 5 October 2016 and it will end on 11 January 2017.

The four best ranked teams advanced to the League 8.

Team Play Off Sarajevo at the beginning of 2017 changed the general sponsor, and is the first part of the season appeared well Play Off Happy, and the other as Play Off Ultra.

Standings

Fixtures and results
All times given below are in Central European Time (for the match played in Bulgaria is time expressed in Eastern European Time).

Game 1

Game 2

Game 3

Game 4

Game 5

Game 6

Game 7

Game 8

Game 9

Game 10

References

External links
Official website

Group A
2016–17 in Serbian basketball
2016–17 in Bosnia and Herzegovina basketball
2016–17 in Bulgarian basketball
2016–17 in Slovenian basketball